San Miguelito could be any of the following geographical locations:

Honduras
San Miguelito, Francisco Morazán
San Miguelito, Intibucá

Mexico
San Miguelito, Nayarit (in the state of Nayarit)
San Miguelito, Querétaro (in the state of Querétaro)
San Miguelito, Sonora (in the state of Sonora)

Nicaragua
San Miguelito, Río San Juan

Panama
San Miguelito District
San Miguelito metro station

United States
San Miguelito Oil Field